Crutch Peaks is a dark, rocky ridge extending 900 m in north-south direction and rising to 275 m in the north extremity of Dryanovo Heights, Greenwich Island in the South Shetland Islands, Antarctica.  The peak surmounts Yakoruda Glacier to the south-southwest, Teteven Glacier to the south-southeast, and Miletich Point and Kabile Island to the north.

The feature was charted by the Discovery Investigations and named descriptively.

Location
(British mapping in 1935 and 1968, and Bulgarian in 2005 and 2009).

See also
 Dryanovo Heights
 Greenwich Island

Maps
 L.L. Ivanov et al. Antarctica: Livingston Island and Greenwich Island, South Shetland Islands. Scale 1:100000 topographic map. Sofia: Antarctic Place-names Commission of Bulgaria, 2005.
 L.L. Ivanov. Antarctica: Livingston Island and Greenwich, Robert, Snow and Smith Islands. Scale 1:120000 topographic map.  Troyan: Manfred Wörner Foundation, 2009.

References
 SCAR Composite Antarctic Gazetteer.

Mountains of Greenwich Island